Torino Women Associazione Sportiva Dilettantistica, or simply Torino Women, is an Italian football team from Torino competing in Serie A.

Founded in 1981, Torino reached five years later Serie A where it has played since. While the club has yet to win a national trophy, Torino was the championship's runner-up in 1994 and 2007. In 2007 it also reached the national Cup's final. In subsequent seasons it has ranked between the 5th and 7th places.

Honours

Titles

Invitational

 Menton Tournament
 1997, 2000

Competition record

Current squad
As of 6 March 2013 (reference) –

Former internationals
 
  Brazil: Michael Jackson
  Italy: Barbara Bonansea, Marta Carissimi, Silvia Fuselli, Raffaella Manieri, Patrizia Panico, Simona Sodini, Maria Sorvillo, Tatiana Zorri
  Romania: Camelia Ceasar
  Spain: Ángeles Parejo

References

Women's football clubs in Italy
Association football clubs established in 1981
Football clubs in Turin
1981 establishments in Italy